WRITERS’ Journal (originally named The Inkling) was founded in 1980 as a four-page newsletter for writers. Through a period of several owners, it was transformed into a full-fledged, professional writers’ journal. The magazine was a 64-page, bi-monthly publication published in the United States.

WRITERS’ Journal catered to aspiring professional writers. Articles were geared to those at all levels of experience, from beginning writers to those who are already professionals. Covering techniques for improving writing style, punctuation, grammar, sentence structure, vocabulary — as well as helpful advice on how to develop various types of writing in both fiction and nonfiction categories.

It offered writers guidance in publishing and selling their work, and advice on desktop publishing, e-publishing, and print-on-demand. Columns covered various creative forms, such as photography, poetry, and screenwriting.

References

External links
 Formerly at www.writersjournal.com, but this site appears to be defunct.

Bimonthly magazines published in the United States
Defunct literary magazines published in the United States
Magazines established in 1980
Magazines with year of disestablishment missing